Beeson may refer to:

People
Beeson (surname)

Places
Beeson, Devon, England
Beeson, West Virginia

Institutions
Beeson Divinity School on the campus of Samford University in Alabama

Other uses
Beeson Covered Bridge, Indiana, USA
Beeson House and Coach House, a landmark in Chicago